R&O may refer to:

Report and order or rulemaking, a process in administrative law
Repair and Overhaul, fixing or performing routine actions to keep technical device in working order
Resisting and Obstructing
Rust and oxidation lubricant, a lubricant treated with rust and oxidation inhibitors

See also 
RNO (disambiguation)